Chuck Berry (1926–2017) was an American rock and roll musician.

Chuck Berry may also refer to:

Chuck Berry (album), a 1975 album by Berry
Chuck Berry (politician) (born 1950), member of the Colorado House of Representatives

See also
Charles Berry (disambiguation)